Ophiohamus is a genus of brittle stars in the family Ophiacanthidae from New Caledonia. Timothy D. O'Hara and Sabine Stöhr circumscribed and named the genus in 2006; they described the type species Ophiohamus nanus in the same work. A second species, Ophiohamus georgemartini, was described by O'Hara and Caroline Harding in 2015. , those are the only two species recognized in this genus.

The genus is distinguished from other closely related genera such as such as Ophiomitrella and Ophiurothamnus by a combination of the following characteristics:
discs with coarse, overlapping disc plates integrated with large, contiguous radial shields, sometimes with spines;
interradial incision shallow, the distal two with widened outer papillae;
small oral and adoral shields, the former distal to the latter and contiguous with the lateral arm plate;
arms curving but not coiling;
3–4 short arm spines, restricted laterally to the arm;
arm spines up to or just exceeding a segment in length;
lowest arm spine semi-hooked;
jaw slit enclosing oral tentacles; and
simple tentacle scale covering small tentacle pore.

References

Ophiuroidea genera
Endemic fauna of New Caledonia
Ophiacanthida